
Hedong (unless otherwise noted) may refer to these places in China:

Districts
Hedong District, Sanya, in Sanya, Hainan
Hedong District, Linyi, in Linyi, Shandong
Hedong District, Tianjin, in Tianjin

Subdistricts
Hedong Subdistrict, Fuyang, in Yingdong District, Fuyang, Anhui
Hedong Subdistrict, Maoming, in Maonan District, Maoming, Guangdong
Hedong Subdistrict, Liuzhou, in Chengzhong District, Liuzhou, Guangxi
Hedong Subdistrict, Botou, in Botou, Hebei
Hedong Subdistrict, Hengshui, in Taocheng District, Hengshui, Hebei
Hedong Subdistrict, Qinhuangdao, in Haigang District, Qinhuangdao, Hebei
Hedong Subdistrict, Shijiazhuang, in Chang'an District, Shijiazhuang, Hebei
Hedong Subdistrict, Harbin, in Acheng District, Harbin, Heilongjiang
Hedong Subdistrict, Baotou, in Donghe District, Baotou, Inner Mongolia
Hedong Subdistrict, Genhe, in Genhe, Inner Mongolia
Hedong Subdistrict, Ji'an, in Qingyuan District, Ji'an, Jiangxi
Hedong Subdistrict, Benxi, in Xihu District, Benxi, Liaoning
Hedong Subdistrict, Fushun, in Shuncheng District, Fushun, Liaoning
Hedong Subdistrict, Delingha, in Delingha, Qinghai

Towns
Hedong, Guazhou County, in Guazhou County, Gansu
Hedong, Wuwei, in Wuwei, Gansu
Hedong, Lianshan County (禾洞), in Lianshan Yao Autonomous County, Guangdong
Hedong, Shanwei, in Lufeng, Guangdong
Hedong, Wuhua County, in Wuhua County, Guangdong
Hedong, Zhuolu County, in Zhuolu County, Hebei
Hedong Town, Baotou, in Donghe District, Baotou, Inner Mongolia
Hedong, Nanbu County, in Nanbu County, Sichuan

Townships
Hedong Township, Fujian, in Songxi County, Fujian
Hedong Township, Heilongjiang, in Shangzhi, Heilongjiang
Hedong Township, Dayu County (河洞乡), in Dayu County, Jiangxi
Hedong Township, De'an County, in De'an County, Jiangxi
Hedong Township, Qinghai, in Guide County, Qinghai
Hedong Township, Jinchuan County, in Jinchuan County, Sichuan
Hedong Township, Qu County, in Qu County, Sichuan
Hedong Township, Yuexi County, in Yuexi County, Sichuan

Chinese history
Hedong Commandery, a division of imperial China
Hedong Circuit, a division of imperial China
Jin (Later Tang precursor) (907–923), an early state of the Five Dynasties period, sometimes known as Hedong

Other uses
Hedong Station (鹤洞站), a station of Guangfo Metro in Guangzhou, Guangdong
Hedong Bridge (鹤洞大桥), a bridge over the Pearl River in Guangzhou
Yinchuan Hedong Airport (银川河东机场), an airport in Yinchuan, Ningxia